Radical 41 or radical inch meaning "thumb" or "inch" is one of the 31 Kangxi radicals (214 radicals total) composed of three strokes.

In the Kangxi Dictionary, there are 40 characters (out of 49,030) to be found under this radical.

 is also the 31st indexing component in the Table of Indexing Chinese Character Components predominantly adopted by Simplified Chinese dictionaries published in mainland China.

Evolution

Derived characters

See also 
 Cun (unit)

Literature

External links

Unihan Database - U+5BF8

041
031